John Thomas Blue (born February 19, 1966) is an American former ice hockey goaltender. He played 46 games in the National Hockey League with the Boston Bruins and Buffalo Sabres between 1992 and 1996. The majority of his career, which lasted from 1987 to 1995, was spent in various minor leagues. Internationally Blue was part of the American national team at the 1988 Winter Olympics, but he did not play. He also was part of the American team at three World Championships, though only played one game, in the 1990 and 1997 tournaments.

Playing career
Blue was the starting goaltender for each of his three seasons on the University of Minnesota hockey team (1984–87). He was named a WCHA First Team All-Star in 1986 and won 64 games during his Gopher career, the fourth highest win total in team history.

During the 1983–84 season he played in the USHL for the Des Moines Buccaneers. He was drafted in the tenth round, 197th overall, by the Winnipeg Jets in the 1986 NHL Entry Draft. Blue made his NHL debut on January 7, 1993 against the Quebec Nordiques. He played in the National Hockey League for the Boston Bruins and Buffalo Sabres and was the first Californian goaltender in the history of the National Hockey League.

International play
He was a backup goalie for the American national team at the 1988 Winter Olympics, but did not play any games. Blue was also part of the American team at the 1990 and 1992 World Championships, only played 5 games in 1990. Named to the national team once more for the 1997 World Championships, he played in one game.

Personal life
Blue was born in Huntington Beach, California, then left for Spokane, Washington at age 5. He began ice skating in Spokane, then after his family moved to San Jose, he became youth goaltender for the Santa Clara Blackhawks  in Northern California.

Throughout his career, he called Huntington Beach his offseason home. He currently works as a pastor after having become deeply involved in religious studies during his playing days.

Career statistics

Regular season and playoffs

International

Awards and honors

References

External links

John Blue @ hockeygoalies.org

1966 births
Living people
Albany Choppers players
American men's ice hockey goaltenders
Austin Ice Bats players
Boston Bruins players
Buffalo Sabres players
Des Moines Buccaneers players
Fort Wayne Komets players
Ice hockey players from California
Kalamazoo Wings (1974–2000) players
Knoxville Cherokees players
Maine Mariners players
Minnesota Golden Gophers men's ice hockey players
Peoria Rivermen (IHL) players
Phoenix Roadrunners (IHL) players
Providence Bruins players
Rochester Americans players
Sportspeople from Huntington Beach, California
Virginia Lancers players
Winnipeg Jets (1979–1996) draft picks